Don Budge and Gene Mako were the defending champions, but were ineligible to compete after turning professional.

Elwood Cooke and Bobby Riggs defeated Charles Hare and Frank Wilde in the final, 6–3, 3–6, 6–3, 9–7 to win the gentlemen's doubles tennis title at the 1939 Wimbledon Championship.

Seeds

  Henner Henkel /  Georg von Metaxa (second round)
  Elwood Cooke /  Bobby Riggs (champions)
  Jean Borotra /  Jacques Brugnon (semifinals)
  Charles Hare /  Frank Wilde (final)

Draw

Finals

Top half

Section 1

Section 2

Bottom half

Section 3

Section 4

References

External links

Men's Doubles
Wimbledon Championship by year – Men's doubles